Naryilco Station also known as Naryilco Downs is a pastoral lease that operates as a cattle station.

Description
It consists of mulga ridges interspersed with cotton bush and saltbush flats with large areas of Mitchell grass and other herbage. A large creek runs through the property which is also well watered by Lake Naryilco, Arramerterry and Yulamatina. The property adjoins Bulloo Downs Station.

History
Mr. L. W. Bate owned the property in 1880 when he sold the property complete with cattle and plant to Alexander Cormack and Co. for a satisfactory price.

In 1885 it was advertised again this time stocked with 3,500 head of cattle and 6,000 sheep. Cormack was found to be insolvent in 1887 and Naryilco was placed on the market again.

The station was acquired by A. McDonald in 1905.

In 1923 over 4,500 head of cattle were purchased from Naryilco for the purpose of restocking Quinyambie, it was thought to be one of the biggest cattle deals of the time.

Airmail delivery to remote properties in outback South Australia, New South Wales and Queensland commenced in 1949. Naryilco along with other remote properties including Mungerannie, Clifton Hills, Glengyle, Davenport Downs, Morney Plains, Mount Leonard, Durrie, Mulka, Tanbar, Durham Downs, Nappa Merrie, Lake Pure and Cordillo Downs were also on the route.

See also
List of ranches and stations
List of the largest stations in Australia

References

Stations (Australian agriculture)
South West Queensland
Pastoral leases in Queensland